SSSR-V6 OSOAVIAKhIM was a semi-rigid airship designed by Italian engineer and airship designer Umberto Nobile and constructed as a part of the Soviet airship program. The airship was named after the Soviet organisation OSOAVIAKhIM.  V6 was the largest airship built in the Soviet Union and one of the most successful. In October 1937, it set a new world record for airship endurance of 130 hours 27 minutes under command of Ivan Pankow, beating the previous record by the German airship Graf Zeppelin.

Crash
In February 1938, a Soviet Arctic expedition led by Ivan Papanin became stranded on drifting ice pack. V6 was sent on a rescue mission from Moscow with a short intermediate landing in Murmansk.

During the flight, at approximately 19:30 on 6 February 1938, the airship crashed into a hillside near Kandalaksha, 220 km south of Murmansk. She caught fire and was destroyed. Of the 19 people on board, 13 perished. Their remains were laid to rest at the Novodevichy Cemetery in Moscow. In 1972, a memorial was erected at the crash site by local authorities and the citizens of Kandalaksha. There is also a memorial sign in Dolgoprudny at the former Soviet airship base.

Officially communication by TASS indicated that the crash was due to poor visibility and insufficient flight altitude. The conclusions of the Soviet investigation into the disaster were never made publicly available. Among the circumstances assumed to have resulted in the disaster were outdated charts and human error; rumors indicated sabotage. No evidence was ever presented.

Recent research revealed that the airship flew off her route as the crew lost orientation in an unfamiliar area because of darkness and snowfall. Possibly contributing to the disorientation was ineffective use of radio navigation equipment (Telefunken's and Fairchild's RC-3 radio direction finders), lack of general navigational experience and human fatigue. Barometric altimeters could have accumulated error while the crew was unable to maintain constant visual control of the altitude.

The accident was a severe blow to the Soviet airship program which was eventually terminated in 1940.

Specifications

See also
List of airship accidents

References

Notes

Bibliography

 Belokrys, Aleksei. Deviat'sot chasov neba. Neizvestnaia istotriia dirizhablia "SSSR-V6" [Nine Hundred Hours in the Sky. The Unknown History of the Airship "SSSR-V6"]. Moscow, Russia: Paulsen, 2017.  (in Russian).
 Belokrys, Aleksei. Dirizhablestroi na Dolgoprudnoi: 1934-i, odin god iz zhizni [Dirizhablestroi in Dolgoprudnaya: 1934, one year of life]. Moscow, Russia: Paulsen, 2011.  (in Russian).

External links

 Air Force Museum - Monino, Russia Grave for Crew of Soviet Airship SSSR-B6 at the Novodevichy Cemetery, Moscow
 Images of the V6 (Russian)
 Map and photo of the monument at the crash site (comments in Russian)
 Photos and bluprint of the V6 (Russian)
  Umberto Nobile. V6 wins the World's Duration Record (Russian)
  Umberto Nobile. The Tragic End of V-6 (Russian)

1930s Soviet aircraft
Airships of Russia
1938 in the Soviet Union
Aviation accidents and incidents in the Soviet Union
Accidents and incidents involving balloons and airships
Burials at Novodevichy Cemetery
Aviation accidents and incidents in 1938